Mergent Sulmataj (born 16 October 1996) is an Albanian football player who most recently played for Kukësi in the Albanian Superliga.

Career

Early career
Sulmataj began playing his career with the youth team of his local club FK Kukësi, where he played until 2013 which is when he joined the Loro Boriçi sports mastery school and began playing for Shkëndija Tiranë, which is the school's football team. He was at the school and Shkëndija Tiranë for 2 years between 2013 and 2015, before joining newly promoted Albanian Superliga side Tërbuni Pukë as a professional player.

Professional career
Sulmataj made his professional debut on 30 August 2015 against Bylis Ballsh, where he came on as a 59th-minute substitute and scored the second goal in the 2–0 away win to hand Tërbuni Pukë their first-ever victory in the top flight. After scoring on his debut, he dedicated his goal to Tërbuni Pukë's head coach Samuel Nikaj as well as his coach Luan Pinari.

Career statistics

Club

References

External links
 Profile - FSHF

1996 births
Living people
People from Kukës
Association football forwards
Albanian footballers
FK Kukësi players
Shkëndija Tiranë players
KF Tërbuni Pukë players
KS Turbina Cërrik players
Kategoria Superiore players
Kategoria e Parë players